Joseph Pointon (1 February 1905 – 1939) was an English footballer who played as a forward.

Career
Pointon played for non-league football for Leek Wesleyans, Leek National, and Congleton Town, before signing with Stoke. He did not feature for the "Potters" however, and so crossed the Potteries divide to join Port Vale as an amateur in April 1923. He played six consecutive Second Division games during the 1923–24 season, filling in for the regular number 7 Jack Lowe. He played four games during the 1925–26 season, but was released upon its conclusion. He moved on to Luton Town, Brighton & Hove Albion, Torquay United, Bristol Rovers and Walsall. He was Torquay's top scorer during the 1929–30 Third Division South season, with sixteen goals. He died young in 1939, in his native Leek.

Career statistics
Source:

References

Sportspeople from Leek, Staffordshire
English footballers
Association football forwards
Stoke City F.C. players
Port Vale F.C. players
Luton Town F.C. players
Brighton & Hove Albion F.C. players
Torquay United F.C. players
Congleton Town F.C. players
Bristol Rovers F.C. players
Walsall F.C. players
English Football League players
1905 births
1939 deaths